Atrabad-e Sofla (also Romanized as Ātrābād-e Soflá) is a village in Badranlu Rural District, in the Central District of Bojnord County, North Khorasan Province, Iran. At the 2006 census, its population was 17, in 6 families.

References 

Populated places in Bojnord County